This list is of the Historic Sites of Japan located within the Prefecture of Iwate.

National Historic Sites
As of 24 December 2022, thirty-three Sites have been designated as being of national significance (including three *Special Historic Sites).

| align="center"|Nabekura Castle SiteNabekura-jō ato || Tōno || || ||  || || 
|-
|}

Prefectural Historic Sites
As of 1 May 2022, thirty-seven Sites have been designated as being of prefectural importance.

Municipal Historic Sites
As of 1 May 2022, a further one hundred and eighty-four Sites have been designated as being of municipal importance.

See also

 Cultural Properties of Japan
 Mutsu Province
 Iwate Prefectural Museum
 List of Places of Scenic Beauty of Japan (Iwate)
 List of Cultural Properties of Japan - paintings (Iwate)

References

External links
  Cultural Properties in Iwate Prefecture
  Map of Ichirizuka in Morioka City

Iwate Prefecture
 Iwate